Tippecanoe Township may refer to the following places in the United States:

Indiana
 Tippecanoe Township, Carroll County, Indiana
 Tippecanoe Township, Kosciusko County, Indiana
 Tippecanoe Township, Marshall County, Indiana
 Tippecanoe Township, Pulaski County, Indiana
 Tippecanoe Township, Tippecanoe County, Indiana

Iowa
 Tippecanoe Township, Henry County, Iowa

See also
 Tippecanoe (disambiguation)

Township name disambiguation pages